Christ or von Christ is a relatively common surname in Germany, especially in Bavaria. Occasionally, the name has been incorporated into pseudonyms.

Those bearing it include:

 Benjamin C. Christ (1824–1869), American Civil War colonel
 Carol P. Christ (born 1945), American academic, feminist and eco-feminist theologian
 Carol T. Christ (born 1944), American academic and administrator
 Charles "Chilla" Christ (1911–1998), Australian cricketer
 Dorothy Christ (1925–2020), All-American Girls Professional Baseball League player
 Elizabeth Christ Trump (1880–1966), German-born American businesswoman, grandmother of U.S. President Donald Trump
 Grégory Christ (born 1982), French football player
 Hermann Christ (1833–1933), Swiss botanist
 Johann Ludwig Christ (1739–1813), German naturalist, gardener and pastor
 John Christ (born 1965), American musician
 Karl Christ (1897 – after 1944), German First World War flying ace
 Lena Christ (1881 - 1920), German writer
 F. Michael Christ (born 1955), American mathematician
 Norman Christ (born c. 1945), American academic
 Sonja Christ (born 1984), 61st German Wine Queen
 Sven Christ (born 1973), Swiss footballer
 Victor Christ-Janer (1915–2008), American architect
 Wilhelm von Christ (1831–1906), German classical scholar

See also
 Jesus, the central figure of Christianity, believed by Christians to be the Christ
 Christ (title), the Greek title for Messiah, the savior and liberator of the Jewish people and mankind 
 Christos (surname)
 Christo (name)